David Watson Ford (born March 23, 1967 in Edmonton, Alberta) is a Canadian slalom canoeist who has competed since the mid-1980s and is still actively competing. He is Canada's most successful slalom paddler.

Career

Ford has won two medals in the K1 event at the ICF Canoe Slalom World Championships. In 1999 he became the first non-European to win the World Championship title. Ford followed up with a World Championship silver in 2003. In 2003 he also won the overall World Cup title in K1. He was named Male Athlete of the Year at the 2003 Canadian Sport Awards, and was inducted into the BC Sports Hall of Fame in 2005.

Ford has competed in five Summer Olympics, earning a fourth-place finish in the K1 event in Athens in 2004. He had a sixth-place finish in the same event in 2008 in Beijing. Ford could not get a sixth appearance in the 2012 Summer Olympics, as of his elbow tendons had ruptured prior to the qualifier, and with no time for the required surgery, countless injections were unable to produce an adequate result for him to paddle to his abilities.

World Cup individual podiums

1 Pan American Championship counting for World Cup points

Personal life

On April 25, 2009, Ford married Canadian alpine skier Kelly VanderBeek. They have a son, Cooper.

References

Official website
Real Champions profile

1967 births
Living people
Canadian male canoeists
Canoeists at the 1992 Summer Olympics
Canoeists at the 1996 Summer Olympics
Canoeists at the 2000 Summer Olympics
Canoeists at the 2004 Summer Olympics
Canoeists at the 2008 Summer Olympics
Olympic canoeists of Canada
Sportspeople from Edmonton
Medalists at the ICF Canoe Slalom World Championships